Wilton Lockwood (September 12, 1861March 21, 1914, age 52) was an American artist born in Wilton, Connecticut.

Biography 
Lockwood was born in Wilton, Connecticut to Emily Middlebrook and John L Lockwood. He was a pupil and an assistant of John La Farge, and also studied in Paris, becoming a well-known portrait and flower painter. He became a member of both the Society of American Artists (1898) and the Copley Society of Art in Boston, as well as an associate and, in 1912, member of the National Academy of Design in New York.  He painted portraits of Grover Cleveland, John La Farge and Justice Oliver Wendell Holmes, Jr.

Lockwood died in Brookline, Massachusetts.

Works by him are held in the collections of the Museum of Fine Arts, Boston, Worcester Art Museum, and the Isabella Stewart Gardner Museum.

References

External links

 
 Sample of his work "Peonies"

1861 births
1914 deaths
19th-century American painters
American male painters
20th-century American painters
American portrait painters
19th-century American male artists
20th-century American male artists